Bostanabad (electoral district) is the 11th electoral district of the East Azerbaijan Province of Iran. It has a population of 94,985 and elects 1 member of parliament.

1980
MP in 1980 from the electorate of Bostanabad. (1st)
 Ghaffar Sajjadnejad

1984
MP in 1984 from the electorate of Bostanabad. (2nd)
 Ghaffar Sajjadnejad

1988
MP in 1988 from the electorate of Kaleybar. (3rd)
 Mohammad Esmaeil Delbari

1992
MP in 1992 from the electorate of Bostanabad. (4th)
 Mohammad Esmaeil Delbari

1996
MP in 1996 from the electorate of Bostanabad. (5th)
 Taher-Aga Barzegar

2000
MP in 2000 from the electorate of Bostanabad. (6th)
 Taher-Aga Barzegar

2004
MP in 2004 from the electorate of Bostanabad. (7th)
 Taher-Aga Barzegar

2008
MP in 2008 from the electorate of Bostanabad. (8th)
 Ahmad Kheyri

2012
MP in 2012 from the electorate of Bostanabad. (9th)
 Gholamreza Nouri Ghezeljeh

2016

Notes

References

Electoral districts of East Azerbaijan
Bostanabad County
Deputies of Bostanabad